16th Regiment or 16th Infantry Regiment may refer to:
 16th Air Defence Regiment, Royal Australian Artillery
 16th Alpini Regiment, a short lived light Infantry training regiment of the Italian Army, specializing in Mountain Combat
 16th Punjab Regiment (Pakistan)

 16th Infantry Regiment (South Korea)
 16th Regiment Royal Artillery, a regiment of the Royal Artillery in the British Army
 16th The Queen's Lancers, a cavalry regiment in the British Army, first raised in 1759
 16th Infantry Regiment (United States), a regiment in the United States Army
 Bedfordshire and Hertfordshire Regiment, British Army regiment formerly designated the 16th Regiment of Foot

United States

American Revolutionary War regiments 
 16th Massachusetts Regiment, a unit of the American Massachusetts Line

American Civil War regiments 
 16th Illinois Volunteer Infantry Regiment, nicknamed "The Twins", an infantry regiment that served in the Union Army during the American Civil War
 16th Regiment Illinois Volunteer Cavalry, a cavalry regiment that served in the Union Army during the American Civil War
 16th Maine Volunteer Infantry Regiment, an infantry regiment that served in the Union Army during the American Civil War
 16th Michigan Volunteer Infantry Regiment, an infantry regiment that served in the Union Army during the American Civil War
 16th West Virginia Volunteer Infantry Regiment, an infantry regiment
 16th Wisconsin Volunteer Infantry Regiment, an infantry regiment that served in the Union Army during the American Civil War

See also 
 16th Army (disambiguation)
 16th Wing (disambiguation)
 16th Group (disambiguation)
 16th Division (disambiguation)
 16th Brigade (disambiguation)
 16th Squadron (disambiguation)